132P/Helin–Roman–Alu, also known as Helin-Roman-Alu 2, is a periodic comet in the Solar System.

References

External links 
 132P/Helin-Roman-Alu 2 – Seiichi Yoshida @ aerith.net
 132P at Kronk's Cometography

Periodic comets
0132
132P
132P
Comets in 2014
19891026